Tracy + the Plastics is an American electropop and video project group from Olympia, Washington, United States. The members include Nikki Romanos on keyboard, Cola on drums, and Tracy as the lead vocals. Although the name implied the group was made up of a lead singer and back up musicians, all three characters were performed by Wynne Greenwood, a lesbian feminist artist using video projection, who calls herself a representative of the "lesbo for disco" generation.

About 
Tracy + the Plastics' music consisted of a Boss DR-5 drum machine, an Akai 612 disc sampler, and combines lo-fi filmmaking, performance art, Devo-styled songs, and feminist and queer politics in an entertaining package. During live performances Nikki and Cola would perform and exist only through projected video previously recorded, and through the performance, the band members would communicate with each other

Tracy + the Plastics was the ultimate result of two other projects Wynne created, the first of these being called The Tooth, then The OK Miss Suit.  "Tracy + the Plastics came from this choose-your-own-adventure murder mystery movie I was writing. The Plastics were a group of girls who ran a pawn shop and replaced parts of themselves with hyper-colorful pieces of plastic. Their town was never-ending, gray drab, surrounded by super-tall mountains that people lived on top of. Bits of plastic debris would fall down the mountains, and the Plastics (Nikki, Cola, Tracy, and Honeyface) would find and use the debris, like a red toothpaste cap for a tooth or something like that."

In 2005, Tracy + the Plastics recorded a version of the Lesbians on Ecstasy song "Summer Luv", which was released on that band's LP of remixes, Giggles In The Dark.

Performances 
 2004 Whitney Biennale.
 2005 The Room with Fawn Krieger in the Kitchen, New York
 This performance was meant to re-imagine the 1970s feminist consciousness by exploring the notions of identity and communication, and question the present state of radical feminism. A way of finding homes within a home, by constructing a grey area for feminists.
 2006 The Room with Fawn Krieger in The Moore Space, Miami
 A continued performance of The ROOM from New York where the audience and is connected to the performance space in a domestic setting, attempting to interrupt linear narratives and physical space, questioning binary systems, emphasizing process, and raising conversations between the temporary and the permanent.
 In June 2006, Wynne Greenwood called an end to the Tracy + The Plastics project.
 2014 "Stacy" at Cooley Gallery in Portland Oregon
 The reform of Tracy + the Plastics as way of nurturing Tracy + the Plastics into contact and conversation with its own future, creating a queering space of intimacy, humor, and hope.  
 September 2015- January 2016 "Kelly" at New Museum in New York
 Bringing into dialogue with more recent work exploring the artists interest in what she called "Culture Healing". "Kelly" considered the poetics of the pause while mining electric gaps of meaning in conversation and offering possibilities for feminist, queer, and other experimental models of collaboration and dialogue

Interaction between Greenwood and the Plastics

Feminism 
In a 2001 essay, Greenwood discusses Tracy + the Plastics and performances in relation to her feminist beliefs. She explains "When an individual in a marginalized group talks to a recorded image of themselves it empowers the individual to open the door to the understanding and celebration that he/she/it can be deliberate. It is an interaction with a fragment self. By fragment, I mean a cohesive identity that's constructed from different often conflicting, parts of society, culture, and life that we relate to because popular culture has no whole identity to offer its audience other than one that resembles the ruling class. We can come out. And then come out again. We can rearrange our world how we want it." As well "a Tracy + the Plastics performance attempts to destroy the inherent hierarchical dynamic of those "spaces"by placing as much importance on the video image (the Plastics) as the live performer (Tracy). The front interacts with the back in a way that emphasizes their equality and the dependence on one another to dismantle their roles and prescribed boundaries."

Reviews 
In Art Forum International (Summer 2005), Johanna Burton describes Tracy + the Plastics as "lo-fi, split-personality hallucination". As well the band members "are all only slightly modified renditions of Greenwood herself- less alter egos or highly evolved personae that seemingly playacted brand of critical levity operates to question, affirm, and confuse both existential and constructed notions of 'the self'.".

In 2004, cultural critic Sara Marcus, writing for The Advocate, said that Tracy + the Plastics's performance art "successfully crosses borders between high art and pop music." Marcus described the act's 2004 album Culture for Pigeon as "elecntronic dance punk" with "complex rhythmic sensibilities" and "increasingly off-kilter beats." [1]

Discography 
 Turn Video (Heartcore Records, 2000)
 Muscler's Guide to Videonics (Chainsaw Records, 2001)
 Forever Sucks EP (Chainsaw Records, 2002)
 Culture for Pigeon (Troubleman Unlimited Records, 2004)
Knit a Claw Re-Do (Too Pure Records, 2004)
 Real Damage Split EP with The Gossip (Dim Mak Records, 2005)

Compilation tracks 
 "Oh Maria" – Calling All Kings & Queens (Mr. Lady Records, 2001)
 "Dead Face" – Nothing Fancy Just Music 7" (NFJM Records, 2003)

References

External links
Official Wynne Greenwood site with Tracy + the Plastics information and archives

Electronic music groups from Washington (state)
Lesbian feminism
LGBT-themed musical groups
American LGBT musicians
Queercore groups